Gordon railway station may refer to:

Gordon railway station, Sydney
Gordon railway station, Victoria

See also 
 Gorton railway station, in Manchester, England
 Gorton railway station (Scotland), a former station